The Motorola A1000 is a 3G smartphone from Motorola. It uses the Symbian 7.0 operating system, enhanced with the UIQ 2.1 platform. One of the phone's most notable features is its built-in A-GPS. The A1000 is the successor to the A925 and A920.

A variant device, named the M1000, appeared in 2005 for the Japanese market, distributed by NTT DoCoMo. The M1000 has a similar spec to the A1000 but supports Wi-Fi instead of GPS/A-GPS.

History
The A1000 was released in Q4 2004, but was available only on contract through the 3 network, in just a few countries (mostly Australia, Austria, Denmark, Italy, Singapore [SingTel], Sweden and the UK). Although two colour schemes were available for the device at the time of release, 3 only offered it in the matte dark & light grey combination. Also, the phone was locked and its firmware contained 3 branding.

The phone raised interest of enthusiasts due to its advanced capabilities, and a few dedicated internet forums appeared. An unbranded firmware became available in these forums, but presented multiple problems and many considered it a leaked beta version. Also, software was developed to overcome limitations of the branded firmware, including an 'application picker' , a 'GPRS account editor'  , and the ability to install software on external storage ).

When, after a whole year, the unlocked and unbranded A1000 appeared, its new firmware version made most of these applications obsolete, as it included their functions. This version of the A1000 was available in a glossy black finish.

The A1000 was among the first phones to use the TransFlash memory format as external storage. The device on its own only supports the smaller capacities of these cards, however it supports the use of adapters to use larger-capacity micro SD cards.

Features
Java
Java ME MIDP 2.0, CLDC 1.0
PersonalJava
 Opera 7.5 Internet browser (735 for English version, 744 for Chinese version and 817J for Japanese version)
 Cameras:
 Outer: CMOS camera
 Effective resolution: 1.31 megapixels
 Recorded resolution: 1.22 megapixels
 Inner: CMOS camera
 Effective resolution: 310,000 pixels
 Recorded resolution: 300,000 pixels
 Built in Picsel Viewer to open Microsoft Word, Microsoft Excel, Microsoft PowerPoint, PDF, etc. files
 Works with multiple e-mail accounts
 Bluetooth compatible for hands-free telephone calls (using wireless headset) and wireless connection to PCs
 Preinstalled with personal information management (PIM) software
 Free software development kit (only beta version available)

Reported software issues
 Autoformat  Early firmware releases (e.g. 51.14.15) have a bug which cause the formatting of phone filesystem as soon as free memory falls under around 45 MB; user is not asked for confirmation, so any data in the phone memory is lost in this case. Further firmware releases fixed the problem (maybe starting from 51.92
 Outbox bug  If an SMS sending fails, SMS get stuck in the outbox and no more attempts are made by the System to send it again. No fixes are available for this bug.
 Memory card size limitation  Although a1000 is compatible with microsd, which should allow size up to 2 GB, no users report to be able to go over 1 GB limit
 AT commands incompatibility  most of standard mandatory AT commands are actually not supported, implemented or working (SMS access, phonebook access,...)

Reported hardware issues
 Charge connector  charge connector does not always connect to the phone, so it does not charge properly.

Limitations
 Memory card lock  Early releases of firmware do not allow installing applications to memory card, and stops memory cards from going over 1 GB, but "NOPEX" 3rd party application fixes this issue.
 Missing autoconnection  Unlike other UIQ phones, a1000 is not able to auto-connect to PC when USB cable is connected: user intervention is required to tap the screen to activate connection; this makes it impossible to recover data from phone in case of screen damages/crash.

External links
Motorola A1000 - Full phone specifications

Motorola smartphones
Symbian devices
Mobile phones introduced in 2004